Michael Ugochukwu Stephens, known professionally as Ruggedman, is a Nigerian rapper from Ohafia, Abia State.

Career
A graduate of political science from Lagos State University, Ọ̀jọ́, Ruggedman started exploring music in 1999. He produced his own songs and released two tracks in 1999, both which were well-played on radio. Ruggedman launched himself into the music industry in 1999, eventually becoming the most featured rapper in Nigeria. His albums are all released on his personal label, Rugged Records. Ruggedman has performed worldwide alongside international acts such as Sean Paul, Wyclef Jean, Akon, Maxi Priest, Kanye West, LL Cool J, T-Pain, and Nas.

Ruggedman's record label, Rugged Records, signed its first act, singer MBRYO, in September 2012. MBRYO was featured on Ruggedman's "Ruggedy Baba pt 2″, produced by Blaize Beatz. Money Making Music, Ruggedman's 2012 album, is a collaboration with MBRYO as part of a promotion for the new artist, with guest appearances by Terry G and Funbi.

Ruggedman hosted the prestigious NB Plc sponsored Star Quest Reality TV Talent Show in 2009, 2010, and 2011.

Controversies 
In 2022, Ruggedman lost the Headies Humanitarian Award to Davido, another Nigerian Artist, and was notably stating that the Headies was “just a popularity contest and Davido was undeserving.”

In 2002, Ruggedman released the controversial song "Ehen" featuring Nomoreloss. The song which was a direct to diss to then established acts in the Nigeria music industry had him mentioning names of Eedris Abdulkareem, Black Reverendz, Maintain and Rasqui for their apparent lack of lyrical contents in their songs.

Discography
Albums
Thy Album Come (2004)
Ruggedy Baba (2007)
Untouchable (2010)
Money Making Music (2012)

Singles

References

External links
 Profile, iroking.com
 Profile, thenetng.com
 Profile, thisdaylive.com 
 Profile, punchng.com

Nigerian male rappers
Igbo rappers
Living people
Nigerian hip hop singers
21st-century Nigerian musicians
The Headies winners
Musicians from Abia State
Lagos State University alumni
21st-century male musicians
1976 births